Stein Endresen (born 4 October 1959) is a Norwegian show jumping competitor.

At the 2008 Summer Olympics in Beijing, Endresen originally won the bronze medal as part of the Norwegian team in team jumping, together with Morten Djupvik, Geir Gulliksen, and Tony Andre Hansen. However the Norwegian team lost its bronze medal and finished tenth following the disqualification of Tony Andre Hansen.

References

1959 births
Norwegian male equestrians
Equestrians at the 2008 Summer Olympics
Living people
Olympic equestrians of Norway
Place of birth missing (living people)
Competitors stripped of Summer Olympics medals
21st-century Norwegian people